Jamaal Torrance (born July 20, 1983) is an American sprinter, who specializes in the 400 meters.

Career
In 2005, Torrance Anchored an NCAA Division II Outdoors 4 x 400 m runner up team (3:07.79) and placed seventh at the NCAA Division II Outdoors (47.41).

In 2006, Torrance came in fourth at the NCAA Division II Outdoors (47.19), became the NCAA Division II Indoor champion (46.89), and anchored for the winning team at the NCAA Division II 4 x 400 m (3:08.78)

At the 2007 Pan American Games, Torrance won a silver medal being part of the 4 x 400 m relay. Torrence finished seventh in the 400 meters with a time of 46.06.

At the 2008 IAAF World Indoor Championships, Torrance won a gold medal being part of the 4 x 400 m relay.

At the 2010 IAAF World Indoor Championships, Torrance won a bronze medal in the 400 meters with a time of 46.43 and a gold medal in the 4 x 400 m relay.

References

External links 
 
 

1983 births
Living people
American male sprinters
Sportspeople from Orlando, Florida
Athletes (track and field) at the 2007 Pan American Games
Pan American Games medalists in athletics (track and field)
Pan American Games silver medalists for the United States
World Athletics Indoor Championships winners
World Athletics Indoor Championships medalists
World Athletics Championships winners
Medalists at the 2007 Pan American Games